Félix-Hippolyte Lanoüe (14 October 1812, Versailles - 21 January 1872, Versailles) was a French landscape painter.

Biography 
Around 1830, he became a student of Jean-Victor Bertin, then entered the workshop of Horace Vernet at the École des beaux-arts de Paris. He was given an award for his use of perspective in 1832 and came in at second place for historical landscapes at the Prix de Rome of 1837. Four years later, he received the grand prize in the same category for his depiction of the angel Camael driving Adam and Eve from Paradise with a flaming sword.

His debut at the Salon came in 1833 and he paid his first visit to Rome that same year. His next exhibit at the Salon would not come until 1847, which brought him a medal. In 1849, he produced a series on the Forest of Fontainebleau when that area first became accessible by train.

After his return to France, he toured the valleys of Isère. This was followed by trips to Holland (1850) and Russia (1853), where he painted scenes en plein aire. He was awarded another medal at the Salon in 1861. His stylistic change from Naturalism to Romanticism came at a time when the latter had started to gain favor with the bourgeoisie. Several of his works were bought by the French government. He was named a Chevalier in the Legion of Honor in 1864.

References

Further reading 
 Louis-Gustave Vapereau, Dictionnaire universel des contemporains: contenant toutes les personnes notables tant en France qu'à l'étranger, Volume 2 p. 1026, Librairie Hachette, Paris, 1861 Online @ Google Books
 Émile Bellier de La Chavignerie, Louis Auvray, Dictionnaire général des artistes de l'École française depuis l'origine des arts du dessin jusqu'à nos jours : architectes, peintres, sculpteurs, graveurs et lithographes, Tome 1, p. 903-904, Librairie Renouard, Paris, 1882 Online @ Gallica

External links 

 Works by Félix-Hippolyte Lanoüe @ the Base Joconde
More works by Lanoüe @ ArtNet

1812 births
1872 deaths
French male painters
French landscape painters
People from Versailles
Prix de Rome for painting
19th-century French painters
École des Beaux-Arts alumni
Chevaliers of the Légion d'honneur
19th-century French male artists